Brad Tiemann (born 21 July 1971) is an American filmmaker who produces, directs, and writes feature films, short films, episodic television, and music videos.
 
Tiemann is known as the executive producer of the Freeform series Movie Night With Karlie Kloss, MTV's Dare to Live, executive producer /director of the MTV series The Buried Life and MTV's animated comedy Greatest Party Story Ever. He wrote and produced the feature film, Circle, a dark thriller featuring Silas Weir Mitchell, Gail O'Grady and America Olivo.   His most notable music video Is It Over by Thievery Corporation, starred Jason Thompson, Julie Marie Berman, and Lil Buck. His short film, Owl Farm, about the alter ego of Hunter S. Thompson, was accepted to the Cannes Film Festival and New York International Film Festival. Tiemann has produced and directed upwards of 200 episodes for A&E (TV channel), Bravo (U.S. TV network), Discovery Channel, MTV, Oxygen (TV channel), Oprah Winfrey Network, TruTV, Red Bull TV, and Sony Pictures.

Biography
Born in Alton, Illinois, Tiemann graduated Alton High School in 1989 and went on to graduate with an Economics degree from University of Illinois at Urbana–Champaign in 1993. Tiemann was a stockbroker in Chicago from 1993 to 1998 and then opened his own firm in St. Louis from 1998 until 2001. Tiemann holds his Series 7, Series 63, Series 8, Series 24 brokerage licenses. During his brokerage years, Tiemann made a comedic film about a nuclear holocaust, Golden Years, which was taste enough for him to uproot from Illinois and move to Los Angeles to begin his career in the film industry.

After film school at UCLA and HFI, his directorial debut was a controversial short film about AIDS and euthanasia called Sunset. Tiemann wrote, directed, and produced the film, birthing his unique surreal, epic film style. It won the Audience Choice Award at the Damah Film Festival, in addition to securing a distribution deal which launched his writing and directing career.

After a bout of screenwriting, Tiemann's feature film Circle was greenlit.  Tiemann wrote and produced the film and directed second unit while collaborating with ASC award winner and two-time Emmy award winner Michael Watkins. Circle was represented by the William Morris  premiering on Showtime, receiving both domestic and foreign distribution deals during the Cannes Film Festival.

Immediately following Circle, Tiemann helped create, direct, and produced the feature-length documentary The Buried Life, a story of four twenty-something men on a road trip to complete life changing events from their own "bucket lists."  It caught national attention and was acquired by MTV to be made into a television series. Tiemann directed two seasons of the groundbreaking documentary series, which resulted in a front-page article in The New York Times and an episode of the Oprah Winfrey Show.

In 2012, Tiemann was hired as Director of Photography for Bravo's Gallery Girls, a docu-drama that followed the lives of six young, twenty-something women working in New York City's hippest art galleries. Tiemann then went on to produce Married to the Army: Alaska, for 44 Blue Productions and the Oprah Winfrey Network (OWN). Married to the Army: Alaska took a deeper look into the lives of seven families and their sacrifices of deployment in Afghanistan. Married to the Army: Alaska was nominated and won a Gracie Award for Outstanding Reality Show. It was also nominated and won the Reality Wanted Award for Most Heartfelt Moment, and won the Hollywood Health and Society Award for Outstanding Reality Series.

In 2013, Tiemann continued on as Supervising Producer for Philly Throttle for Discovery, and produced four seasons of Bad Girls Club for the Emmy Award-winning Bunim/Murray Productions and Oxygen.

Tiemann went on to produce A&E's highly profiled Mark Wahlberg reality series Breaking Boston. The series showcases the real women of Boston, featuring the day-to-day life of four tough, hard-as-nails women who juggle family, work, and relationships, all while remaining true to their way of life. Tiemann then went on to produce MTV's The Challenge. In 2014 Tiemann produced another inspirational feature documentary, Drop In, that followed paraplegic Jeremy McGhee on dangerous and exciting adventures teaching us that nothing should stop anyone from realizing their goals.

Tiemann went on in 2015 and 2016 to help create, produce, and direct the animated comedy Greatest Party Story Ever. He also created and executive produced Fuse's award-winning transgender series, Transcendent.

In 2016 Tiemann went to A&E  backed Propagate Content, as Head of Production. Tiemann, along with its founder and former president of National Geographic Network, Howard T Owens, helped with the inception of the company in addition to building its development slate.

In 2017 Tiemann was hired as President & COO of THEOS, known for MTV's Dare to Live and Freeform's Movie Night With Karlie Kloss. Tiemann, along with founder and CEO, Dave Lingwood, former star of MTV's The Buried Life, aim to create demographic specific content, targeted at the Gen-Z and Millennial generations with one simple goal: “Create content that destroys molds."

Personal life
In 2001, Tiemann married Jennifer (Bishop) Tiemann on Captiva Island in Florida.  They have two children, daughter Julia Elise (Born April 2, 2007) and son Miles Cole (Born June 19, 2011). They currently reside at their avocado farm in Southern California. Tiemann is an avid painter, golfer, and basketball player. He is a fan of the St. Louis Cardinals, Arizona Cardinals, and Chicago Bulls.

Awards/Notable Accomplishments
In 2013, Married to The Army: Alaska is nominated and wins the Gracie Award for Outstanding Reality Show, and is nominated and wins for the Reality Wanted Awards for Most Heartfelt Moment. 
 
In 2013, Bad Girls Club is nominated at the Reality Wanted Awards for the Guilty Pleasure category.
  
In 2012, The Buried Life'''s book titled "What Do You Want To Do Before You Die?" became a New York Times #1 Best Seller and remained on the list for 4 weeks.

In 2011, The Buried Life again earned a nomination for the Do Something TV Show Award from the VH1 Do Something Awards.
 
In February 2011, The Buried Life was nominated for the 15th Annual Prism Awards. The PRISM Awards honor powerfully entertaining productions that realistically show substance abuse and addiction, as well as mental health issues.

In October 2010, The Buried Life helped make a $100,000 donation to the World Food Programme (Fighting Hunger World Wide).

In October 2010, The Buried Life set the record for the largest roulette spin in Vegas history placing a bet of $250,000 on black at The Golden Gate Casino. The previous record was set at $135,000 by radio personality Howard Stern.
 
In 2010, The Buried Life earned a nomination for the Do Something TV Show Award from the VH1 Do Something Awards. The Buried Life received a nomination for its efforts to encourage people to pursue their life goals.

In 2010, Tiemann joined The Buried Life'' as they appeared on The Oprah Winfrey Show where they helped a young girl conquer her fear of heights.

References

1971 births
Living people
American filmmakers
University of Illinois Urbana-Champaign alumni
UCLA Film School alumni